Rona-Lee Shimon (born January 9, 1983) is an Israeli actress and model. She is known primarily for her leading role in Fauda.

Early life 
Rona-Lee Shimon was born in Ramat Gan, Israel, to a Jewish family. When she was 3 years old, she started taking ballet lessons. At age 12, she joined Israeli dance troupe Bat Dor (בת דור). After graduating high school, she attended the Royal Ballet Academy in Amsterdam on a full scholarship. She then returned to Israel to dance professionally. Her sister, Sivan Noam Shimon, is also an actress, who acted in 2015 Israeli drama film Blush. Her brother, Almog Shimon, taught her how to shoot a gun for Fauda.

Career 
In 2005, she was a contestant on the Israeli version of So You Think You Can Dance, called Born to Dance (נולד לרקוד). In 2006, Rona-Lee joined the cast of Our Song (השיר שלנו), a musical Israeli soap opera, as Shiri Gold, a singer in a military band.

Rona-Lee went to the theater school for three years and performed in plays like Cabaret and Chicago, with her latest role as Anita in West Side Story.

She is known primarily for her leading role in Fauda. Her character, Nurit, is the only woman in the Israeli counter-terrorism unit formed almost exclusively of men. To perform that role, Rona-Lee did all the stunts herself as did the rest of the cast, and her training included how to fire a weapon, Krav Maga, and kickboxing.

In 2020, she appeared as Mika in Messiah.

Filmography

References

External links

Living people
1983 births
People from Ramat Gan
Israeli female models
Israeli film actresses
Israeli television actresses
21st-century Israeli actresses